Edward Lydall was an English stage actor of the seventeenth century. He was a member of the King's Company at the Theatre Royal, Drury Lane. His first known performance was in 1668. He generally played supporting roles. His surname is sometimes written as Lidell.

Selected roles
 Don Melchor de Guzman in An Evening's Love by John Dryden (1668)
 Valerius in Tyrannick Love by John Dryden (1669)
 Statilius in The Roman Empress by William Joyner (1670)
 Prince Abdalla in The Conquest of Granada by John Dryden (1670)
 Signor Cassidoro in The Generous Enemies by John Corye (1671)
 Argaleon in Marriage à la mode by John Dryden (1672)
 Collins in Amboyna by John Dryden (1673)
 Don Alonzo in The Spanish Rogue by Thomas Duffett (1673)
 Piso in Nero by Nathaniel Lee (1674)
 Lelius in Sophonisba by Nathaniel Lee (1675)
 Apollo in Psyche Debauched by Thomas Duffet (1675)
 Loredano in Love in the Dark by Francis Fane (1675)
 Dorilant in The Country Wife by William Wycherley (1675)
 Tiberius in Gloriana by Nathaniel Lee (1676)
Oroandes in Wits Led By the Nose by William Chamberlayne (1677)
 Perdiccas in The Rival Queens by Nathaniel Lee (1677)
 Sir Oliver Bellingham in The Country Innocence by John Leanerd (1677)

References

Bibliography
 Van Lennep, W. The London Stage, 1660–1800: Volume One, 1660–1700. Southern Illinois University Press, 1960.
 Wilson, John Harold. Mr. Goodman the Player. University of Pittsburgh Press, 1964.

17th-century English people
English male stage actors
17th-century English male actors
Year of birth unknown
Year of death unknown